Yaris Riyadi (born 21 January 1973) is an Indonesian former professional footballer who played as a attacking midfielder. He represented Indonesia internationally at the 2000 AFC Asian Cup.

Club career
Riyadi started his career with Persib Bandung.

Career statistics

International 

 Scores and results list Indonesia's goal tally first, score column indicates score after each Riyadi goal.

References

External links
 
 

1973 births
Living people
People from Bandung
Sportspeople from West Java
Indonesian footballers
Association football midfielders
Persib Bandung players
Pelita Jaya FC players
Persikab Bandung players
PSIS Semarang players
Bandung F.C. players
Indonesian Premier Division players
Indonesia international footballers